Loculus (Latin, "little place"), plural loculi, is an architectural compartment or niche that houses a body, as in a catacomb, hypogeum, mausoleum or other place of entombment. In classical antiquity, the mouth of the loculus might be closed with a slab, plain, as in the Catacombs of Rome, or sculptural, as in the family tombs of ancient Palmyra.

See also
 Kokh (tomb): sometimes translated as "loculus"
 Arcosolium: another niche-like tomb
 Glossary of architecture

References

Sources
 

Architectural elements
Death customs
Burial monuments and structures